Ponsonby is a civil parish in the Borough of Copeland, Cumbria, England. It contains five listed buildings that are recorded in the National Heritage List for England. Of these, one is listed at Grade II*, the middle of the three grades, and the others are at Grade II, the lowest grade.  The parish is almost completely rural, and the listed buildings comprise a church, a country house and its lodge, and two farmhouses.


Key

Buildings

References

Citations

Sources

Lists of listed buildings in Cumbria